Epiphyllum ("upon the leaf" in Greek) is a genus of epiphytic plants in the cactus family (Cactaceae), native to Central America and South America. Common names for these species include climbing cacti, orchid cacti and leaf cacti, though the latter also refers to the genus Pereskia.

Description
The stems are broad and flat, 1–5 cm broad, 3–5 mm thick, usually with lobed edges. The flowers are large, 8–16 cm diameter, white through red, with numerous petals. Flowers bloom only at night, and wilt at dawn. The fruit is edible, very similar to the pitaya fruit from the closely related genus Hylocereus, though not so large, being only 3–4 cm long. The broad-leaved epiphyllum (Epiphyllum oxypetalum) is particularly well-known. It bears large, strongly fragrant flowers that each usually open for a single night only.

The plants known as epiphyllum hybrids, epiphyllums or just epis, which are widely grown for their flowers, are artificial hybrids of species within the tribe Hylocereeae, particularly species of Disocactus. In spite of the common name, the involvement of Epiphyllum species as parents of epiphyllum hybrids is unconfirmed.

Extant species
, Plants of the World Online accepts 10 species:

Formerly placed here
Disocactus crenatus (Lindl.) M.Á.Cruz & S.Arias (as Epiphyllum crenatum (Lindl.) G.Don)
Disocactus lepidocarpus (F.A.C.Weber) M.Á.Cruz & S.Arias (as Epiphyllum lepidocarpum (F.A.C.Weber) Britton & Rose)
Disocactus phyllanthoides (DC.) Barthlott (as E. phyllanthoides (DC.) Sweet)

References

External links

 Epi Species (GotEpis.com), a comprehensive list of genera of epiphytic cacti.

 
Night-blooming plants
Epiphytes
Cactoideae genera